Bastiaan is a Dutch masculine given name, short for Sebastiaan (Sebastian). People with this name include:

Bastiaan Johan Christiaan Ader (1942–1975), Dutch conceptual and performance artist
Bastiaan Belder (born 1946), Dutch politician
Bastiaan Jan van Bochove (born 1950), Dutch politician
Bastiaan Cornelis van Fraassen  (born 1941), Dutch-born American philosopher
Bastiaan de Gaay Fortman (born 1937), Dutch politician and scholar
Bastiaan Geleijnse (born 1967), Dutch cartoonist and comics artist
Bastiaan Giling (born 1982), Dutch road cyclist
Bastiaan Govertsz van der Leeuw (1624–1680), Dutch landscape painter
Bastiaan Johan Heijne (born 1960), Dutch writer and translator
Bastiaan Lijesen (born 1990), Dutch swimmer
Bastiaan Maliepaard (born 1938), Dutch cyclist
Bastiaan Jacob Dirk Meeuse (1916–1999), Dutch-American botanist and naturalist
Bastiaan Ort (1854–1927), Dutch lawyer, judge and Minister of Justice from 1913 to 1918
Bastiaan Jacob Paauwe (1911–1989), Dutch footballer
Bastiaan Ragas (born 1971), Dutch singer and actor
Bastiaan Tamminga (born 1981), Dutch swimmer
Bastiaan Johannis van der Vlies (born 1941), Dutch politician
Bastiaan van 't Wout (born 1979), Dutch footballer
Bastiaan Zuiderent (born 1977), Dutch cricketer

Dutch masculine given names